Derech HaShem (The "Way of the Name") is a philosophical text written in the early 1740s by Rabbi Moshe Chaim Luzzatto. It is considered one of the quintessential handbooks of Jewish thought.

The text covers a vast gamut of philosophical topics in the vast spectrum of classical Judaism's outlook on the world. These topics include the purpose of creation, the Creator, human responsibility, the spiritual realms, providence, Israel and the nations, astrology, the human soul, theurgy, prophecy, the study of Torah, prayer, and the function of mitzvah observance. All these are brought in a clear flowing structure that builds on previous topics.

Principles 
The text systematizes the basic principles of Jewish belief regarding the existence of God, God's purpose in creation, and the logical consequence of other concepts in Judaism. The reader is led from thought to idea, from idea to a logical whole of the structure of Jewish belief. One of its core assertions is that man was created for the purpose of earning closeness to the creator by struggling against evil inclinations. According to Luzzatto, the world calls for mesiras nefesh in order to retain sanctity and overcome evil. This is the concept interpreted as the "devotion to Hashem to the extent of total self-negation". It, therefore, outlines ideals concerning daily living. For instance, it maintains that hashem increases self-esteem whereas dependence on others for sustenance diminishes it. 

Presented from a Kabbalistic perspective, yet presupposing no prior knowledge and without the use of Kabbalistic terminology, this work provides a foundation for understanding the worldview and ideas found in the throughout Jewish works on these topics.   

The book is organized into four main sections: the general basis of all existence, God's Divine Providence and interface with Creation, prophecy and the Human soul, and practical religious observance.

References

External links
 Hebrew Fulltext, daat.ac.il
 Lecture series (in English) elucidating the whole of Derech Hashem & Ma'amer HaIkkarim 
 Online classes, Rabbi Yaakov Feldman, torah.org
 The Way of God, trans. Aryeh Kaplan, Feldheim 1997. 
 First step on the ladder of ascent, Rabbi Avraham Greenbaum

1730s books
Jewish philosophical literature
Kabbalah texts
Hebrew-language religious books